Lower Manair Dam also known as LMD was constructed across the Manair River, at Alugunur village, Thimmapur mandal, Karimnagar District, in the Indian state of Telangana during 1974 to 1985.

Location
The Lower Manair Dam is located on the Manair River at 18°24' N latitude and 79° 20' E longitude in Karimnagar District at Km.146 of Kakatiya Canal. The Manair River is a tributary of the Godavari River and the dam is built across the river at the confluence with Mohedamada River.
   
In the vicinity of the LMD which is the only place of recreation for the people of Karimnagar, in the light of recent drowning incidents and the insecurity created by hooligans, security measures have been stepped up.

Features
Lower Manair Dam's construction was started in 1974 and commissioned in 1985. It is an Earth cum Masonry dam. The gross storage capacity of the reservoir is 680 million cubic meter and the live storage capacity is 380.977 million cum. The spillway is designed for discharge of capacity / second (and is controlled by 20 gates of  size, while the maximum observed flood discharge is reported to be /second.
 
The storage behind the dam serves as a balancing reservoir for the Kakatiya Canal and regulates flow for irrigation.

The water quality status of the Lower Manair Reservoir was studied from September 2009 to August 2010 for the physico- chemical parameters such as water temperature, pH, turbidity, transparency, total dissolved solids, total hardness, chlorides, phosphate, nitrates, dissolved oxygen (DO) and biological oxygen demand (BOD). The results indicated that all parameters of water quality were within permissible limits and it was concluded that the water in the reservoir was fit for use for irrigation, drinking water supply and pisciculture.

Reservoir fisheries
Studies were conducted in the LMD reservoir from June, 2013 to May, 2014 to identify the larvivorous activity of fishes. On the basis of morphometric and meristematic characters, the 58 fish species are identified in the reservoir. Also reported were 53 ornamental fish species comprising eight orders; of these 23 species belong to cypriniformes order. Awaous grammepomus, also called Scribbled goby was also identified.

See also

 Sriram Sagar Project
 SRSP Flood Flow Canal
 Mid Manair Dam
 Upper Manair Dam
 Sripada Yellampalli project
 Nizam Sagar
 Kaddam Project
 Pranahita Chevella
 Alisagar lift irrigation scheme
 Sri Komaram Bheem Project
 Icchampally Project

References

Dams on the Godavari River
Dams in Telangana
Earth-filled dams
Godavari basin
Dams completed in 1985
1985 establishments in Andhra Pradesh
Tourist attractions in Karimnagar district
20th-century architecture in India